Greenback is a ghost town and former mining town in Josephine County, Oregon.

History
Greenback was named for the nearby Greenback Mine, a gold and quartz mine which was once the richest mine in Oregon by feet of tunnel mined. The Greenback Mine was established by Len Browning and Edward Hanum in 1897. It was sold to banker William Brevoot in 1902, and he founded the town. The post office was established in August 1902 and disestablished in June 1908. Carey W. Thompson was the first postmaster.

References

Unincorporated communities in Josephine County, Oregon
Unincorporated communities in Oregon
Ghost towns in Oregon